Norton County (standard abbreviation: NT) is a county located in the U.S. state of Kansas. As of the 2020 census, the county population was 5,459. The largest city and county seat is Norton. The county was established in 1867 and named for Orloff Norton, captain of Company L, 15th Kansas Militia Infantry Regiment.

History

Early history

For many millennia, the Great Plains of North America was inhabited by nomadic Native Americans. From the 16th century to 18th century, the Kingdom of France claimed ownership of large parts of North America. In 1762, after the French and Indian War, France secretly ceded New France to Spain, per the Treaty of Fontainebleau.

19th century
In 1802, Spain returned most of the land to France, but keeping title to about 7,500 square miles. In 1803, most of the land for modern day Kansas was acquired by the United States from France as part of the 828,000 square mile Louisiana Purchase for 2.83 cents per acre.

In 1854, the Kansas Territory was organized, then in 1861 Kansas became the 34th U.S. state.  Norton County was founded by Noah H. Billings, Thomas Beaumont, Henry Gordon, P. Hansen, and George Cole on August 22, 1872. In 1878 Norton became the county seat. The county gets its name for Civil War soldier Orloff Norton, who was killed at Cane Hill, Arkansas in 1864.

The first county fair, although not official, was held in Leota in October, 1878. After 1900 the fair was held yearly in Elmwood Park in Norton. The first school district was formed in Norton in 1872. School was held in a dugout beginning December 1, 1873.

21st century
In 2020, Norton County became a major hotspot in the COVID-19 pandemic. In July, an inmate at the Norton Correctional Facility, a state prison, tested positive for coronavirus. By mid-October, more than 130 cases had been reported at the prison. On October 19, officials announced that all 62 residents of the Andbe Home nursing home in Norton had tested positive for COVID-19, 10 of whom had died. As of October 20, Norton County had the highest rate of infection over the previous 7 and 14 days of any county in the United States.

Geography

Adjacent counties
 Furnas County, Nebraska (north)
 Harlan County, Nebraska (northeast)
 Phillips County (east)
 Graham County (south)
 Sheridan County (southwest)
 Decatur County (west)

Demographics

As of the 2000 US census, there were 5,953 people, 2,266 households, and 1,470 families residing in the county. The population density was 7 people per square mile (3/km2). There were 2,673 housing units at an average density of 3 per square mile (1/km2). The racial makeup of the county was 93.35% White, 4.05% Black or African American, 0.44% Native American, 0.42% Asian, 0.02% Pacific Islander, 1.02% from other races, and 0.71% from two or more races. 2.37% of the population were Hispanic or Latino of any race.

There were 2,266 households, out of which 28.20% had children under the age of 18 living with them, 55.50% were married couples living together, 7.00% had a female householder with no husband present, and 35.10% were non-families. 32.30% of all households were made up of individuals, and 17.90% had someone living alone who was 65 years of age or older. The average household size was 2.28 and the average family size was 2.89.

In the county, the population was spread out, with 22.00% under the age of 18, 7.70% from 18 to 24, 28.30% from 25 to 44, 22.30% from 45 to 64, and 19.60% who were 65 years of age or older. The median age was 40 years. For every 100 females there were 122.10 males. For every 100 females age 18 and over, there were 122.90 males.

The median income for a household in the county was $31,050, and the median income for a family was $37,036. Males had a median income of $25,983 versus $20,381 for females. The per capita income for the county was $16,835. About 6.10% of families and 10.50% of the population were below the poverty line, including 12.70% of those under age 18 and 8.20% of those age 65 or over.

Government

County
Noah H. Billings was an early county settler, county superintendent of schools, county attorney, and state representative. Keith Sebelius served as a U.S. congressman from 1969 to 1981.

Presidential elections

Like all the High Plains, Norton County is overwhelmingly Republican. In 1964, the last time the Republicans did not carry Kansas’ electoral votes, Norton County was Barry Goldwater’s second-best county in the state behind Clay County. The last Democrat to reach forty percent of the county’s vote was Franklin D. Roosevelt in 1936, ironically against Kansas Governor Alf Landon. Roosevelt in 1932 was the last Democrat to carry Norton County, and the only others are Woodrow Wilson (twice) and William Jennings Bryan in his first 1896 campaign.

Laws
Following amendment to the Kansas Constitution in 1986, the county remained a prohibition, or "dry", county until 1992, when voters approved the sale of alcoholic liquor by the individual drink with a 30 percent food sales requirement.

Education

Unified school districts 
 Norton USD 211
 Northern Valley USD 212

Communities

Cities
 Almena
 Clayton
 Edmond
 Lenora
 Norton (county seat)

Townships
Norton County is divided into four townships. The city of Norton is considered governmentally independent and is excluded from the census figures for the townships. In the following table, the population center is the largest city (or cities) included in that township's population total, if it is of a significant size. The 2010 census shows the area of the former Harrison-District 6 as combined into that of Almena-District 4.

See also
National Register of Historic Places listings in Norton County, Kansas

References

Notes

Further reading

 Handbook of Norton County, Kansas; C.S. Burch Publishing Co; 16 pages; 1880s.
 Standard Atlas of Norton County, Kansas; Geo. A. Ogle & Co; 71 pages; 1917.

External links

County
 
 Norton County - Directory of Public Officials
Maps
 Norton County Maps: Current, Historic, KDOT
 Kansas Highway Maps: Current, Historic, KDOT
 Kansas Railroad Maps: Current, 1996, 1915, KDOT and Kansas Historical Society

 
Kansas counties
1867 establishments in Kansas
Populated places established in 1867